Karl Gschwind (born 18 October 1943) is a Swiss boxer. He competed in the men's welterweight event at the 1972 Summer Olympics.

References

1943 births
Living people
Swiss male boxers
Olympic boxers of Switzerland
Boxers at the 1972 Summer Olympics
Place of birth missing (living people)
Welterweight boxers